This Is Us is an American television series created by Dan Fogelman for NBC. It follows the lives and families of two parents and their three children born on the same day as their father's birthday. The series stars an ensemble cast featuring Milo Ventimiglia, Mandy Moore, Sterling K. Brown, Chrissy Metz, Justin Hartley, Susan Kelechi Watson, Chris Sullivan, and Ron Cephas Jones. Jon Huertas, Alexandra Breckenridge, Niles Fitch, Logan Shroyer, Hannah Zeile, Mackenzie Hancsicsak, Parker Bates, Eris Baker, Faithe Herman, Lonnie Chavis, Melanie Liburd, Lyric Ross, Asante Blackk, Griffin Dunne, Caitlin Thompson, and Chris Geere joined the principal cast in later seasons. The series premiered on September 20, 2016.

In May 2019, NBC renewed the series through a sixth and final season.

Series overview

Episodes

Season 1 (2016–17)

Season 2 (2017–18)

Season 3 (2018–19)

Season 4 (2019–20)

Season 5 (2020–21)

Season 6 (2022)

Ratings

References

External links
 
 

This Is Us
This Is Us